Regina Beach is a town in south central Saskatchewan, located on Highway 54, close to where Highway 11 (which connects Saskatoon to Regina) intersects with the Qu'Appelle Valley.

As Regina Beach rests on shores of the south end of Last Mountain Lake, it becomes an active lakeside resort town in summer. To the east is Buena Vista, their boundary marked by 16 Street.

Regina Beach Recreation Site

Regina Beach Recreation Site is a provincial recreation site on the western shore of Last Mountain Lake. The park runs along the lake's shore in the town of Regina Beach from Centre Street south to 16 Street. Park amenities include a large sandy beach area, picnic area, beach volleyball courts, children's playground, boat launch, and a fish filleting building. This is no overnight camping.

Just off shore, Sask Aquatic Adventures has a water adventure park set up. It is one of nine in Saskatchewan. The others are located at Blackstrap Lake, the Battlefords, Buffalo Pound, Duck Mountain, Greenwater Lake, Tufts Bay on Lake Diefenbaker by Elbow, Sandy Bay at Candle Lake Provincial Park, and Greig Lake at Meadow Lake Provincial Park.

Regina Beach Golf Club
The Regina Beach Golf Club is a 9-hole golf course that opened in 1969. It runs along the south side of town and includes a restaurant and lounge.

Education
While for most of its history Regina Beach students were bused to nearby Lumsden, in 1989 Regina Beach opened its own K-8 elementary school.

Demographics 

See also
List of towns in Saskatchewan
List of resort villages in Saskatchewan
List of communities in Saskatchewan
Tourism in Saskatchewan

References

External links

 

Towns in Saskatchewan
Lumsden No. 189, Saskatchewan
Division No. 6, Saskatchewan